Giannis Komianidis (1938 – 28 April 2015) was a Greek footballer. He played in three matches for the Greece national football team from 1964 to 1965.

References

External links
 

1938 births
2015 deaths
Greek footballers
Greece international footballers
Place of birth missing
Association footballers not categorized by position